Offshore  may refer to:

Science and technology 
 Offshore (hydrocarbons)
 Offshore construction, construction out at sea
 Offshore drilling, discovery and development of oil and gas resources which lie underwater through drilling a well
 Offshore hosting, server
 Offshore wind power, wind power in a body of water
 Offshore geotechnical engineering
 Offshore aquaculture

Arts, entertainment, and media
 Offshore (novel), a 1979 British novel by Penelope Fitzgerald
The Offshore, an elite enclave of the chosen, in 3%
 Offshore (album), a 2006 album by Indiana-based post-rock band Early Day Miners
 "Offshore" (song), a 1996 song by British electronic dance music act Chicane

Finance and law 
 Offshore bank, relates to the banking industry in offshore centers
 Offshore company
 Offshore financial centre, jurisdictions which transact financial business with non-residents
 Offshore fund, collective investment in offshore centers
 Offshore investment, relates to the wider financial services industry in offshore centers
Offshore Stock Broker, relates to stock brokers in offshore centers
 Offshore trust, trust arranged in offshore jurisdiction
 Offshoring, active movement of companies to offshore centers

Other uses
 Offshore balancing, a concept used in analysis of international relations
 Offshore powerboat racing, powerboat racing
 Offshore, below the intertidal zone

See also 
 Tax haven